Robert Battle (born August 28, 1972 in Jacksonville, Florida, USA) is a dancer, choreographer and the Artistic Director of Alvin Ailey American Dance Theater.

Early life and education
Originally from the Liberty City community of Miami, Florida, Battle was raised by his great uncle Willie Horne and his cousin Dessie Horne in economically poor living conditions. He studied at the New World School of the Arts before graduating from the Juilliard School, where he received a Bachelor of Fine Arts degree in 1994.

Career

Upon graduation from Juilliard, he joined the Parsons Dance Company.  He founded his own Battleworks Dance Company in 2001.

Battle was named one of the Masters of African American Choreography by the Kennedy Center for the Performing Arts in 2005.

In 2015 Battle was named a Ford Foundation Art of Change Fellow.

Alvin Ailey

He began the directorship on July 1, 2011, and is its third director since the company's 1958 inception.  When receiving the position Battle says, "I hope to be worthy of this tremendous responsibility that I've been given, and to honor it in the only way Alvin Ailey would have accepted: by keeping it now, alive and moving forward". Although Battle was never formally part of the Ailey company prior to his appointment, making him the first artistic director with no direct connection to the company or to Ailey himself, he contributed a number of works to the company's repertoire, and had long been recognized as the anointed successor to Judith Jamison. As Jamison was in an interview she says, "that Battle's choreography has the ability to draw audiences into his work, and it reminds her of Alvin". He served several terms as artist-in-residence with Ailey.

Works

1999- Takademe
2000- Promenade
2001- The Hunt
2004- Feast
2004- Mass
2004- Strange Humors
2006- Final Sounds
2007- Bon Appétit!
2007- No Longer Silent
2007- Unfold
2008- Ella
2008- In/Side
2010- Three

References

External links
Archival footage of Battleworks Dance Company performing Robert Battle's Strange Humors in 2003 at Jacob’s Pillow Dance Festival.

1972 births
Living people
People from Jacksonville, Florida
Artistic directors (music)
American choreographers
Juilliard School alumni